The Respiratory Therapy Society of Ontario is a non-profit organization of respiratory therapists and other healthcare professionals devoted to the promotion of Respiratory Therapy in the province of Ontario.

Organizations within the RTSO
 Anesthesia Respiratory Therapist Association of Ontario
 Ontario Association of Homecare Respiratory Therapists

References

Respiratory therapy